Prior to its uniform adoption of proportional representation in 1999, the United Kingdom used first-past-the-post for the European elections in England, Scotland and Wales. The European Parliament constituencies used under that system were smaller than the later regional constituencies and only had one Member of the European Parliament each.

The constituency of Mid Scotland and Fife was one of them.

Boundaries
1979-1984: Clackmannan and East Stirlingshire, Dunfermline, Fife Central, Fife East, Kinross and West Perthshire, Kirkcaldy, Perth and East Perthshire, Stirling, Falkirk and Grangemouth, Stirlingshire West,
1984-1999: Central Fife, Clackmannan, Dunfermline East, Dunfermline West, Falkirk East, Falkirk West, Kirkcaldy, North East Fife, Perth and Kinross, Stirling

Members of the European Parliament

Election results

References

Politics of Fife
European Parliament constituencies in Scotland (1979–1999)
1979 establishments in Scotland
1999 disestablishments in Scotland
Constituencies established in 1979
Constituencies disestablished in 1999